Jerzy Młynarczyk (2 August 1931 – 9 September 2017) was a Polish politician and basketball player. He was born in Wilno, Poland (now Vilnius, Lithuania). He competed in the men's tournament at the 1960 Summer Olympics. He was professor of law, including principal of University of Business and Administration in Gdynia and served as a Mayor of Gdańsk in 1977–1981. He was also member of the Polish parliament (Sejm) from 2001 to 2005 for the Social Democracy of Poland party.

References

External links
 
 
 

1931 births
2017 deaths
Politicians from Gdańsk
Mayors of Gdańsk
Politicians from Vilnius
Basketball players from Vilnius
People from Wilno Voivodeship (1926–1939)
Polish sportsperson-politicians
Members of the Polish Sejm 2001–2005
Polish men's basketball players
Olympic basketball players of Poland
Basketball players at the 1960 Summer Olympics
Lech Poznań (basketball) players